Peter van Liesebetten or Pieter van Lisebetten (1630 – 1678) was an engraver from the Southern Netherlands.

Liesebetten was born in Antwerp and is known for engravings after old master paintings, most notably a selection of paintings for David Teniers the Younger for his Theatrum Pictorium.

Liesebetten died in Antwerp.

References

1630 births
1678 deaths
Artists from Antwerp
Flemish engravers
17th-century Flemish painters